Johan Larsson (born 22 July 1877 in Vendel, died 26 February 1947 in Vendel), was a Swedish ski manufacturer and politician. He was a member of the upper house of the bicameral Swedish parliament from 1929 to 1938, representing the Free-minded National Association and, from 1934, the People's Party, for the Stockholm County and Uppsala County electoral district. He was a member of the parliamentary committees for finance (bankoutskottet) and taxation (bevillningsutskottet). According to the tradition in the Swedish parliament, he was referred to as Johan Larsson i Örbyhus in order to differentiate him from other members of parliament called Johan Larsson.

Larsson was also a member of Uppsala County Council between 1925 and 1942.

In 1893, Larsson founded a ski manufacturing business in his home in Vendel. His brother Lars Erik joined the business in 1895, and in 1905 when their production exceeded 3000 pairs of skis per year, the brothers built a ski factory in Örbyhus, called Bröderna Larssons Snickeri- & Skidfabrik, AB. The factory existed until 1952.

Larsson died in a fire in his home in February 1947.

References

Members of the Första kammaren
1877 births
1947 deaths